is a public park in the Sengen-cho region of the city of Fuchū in Tokyo. It is located a little east of the center of the city, close to Higashi-fuchū Station.

Facilities
 Flower promenade running north and south in the center of the park
 Monument
 Observation open space
 Musashino Forest on the west side
 Large open space (lawn)
 Sports facilities (tennis courts, small baseball field, soccer/hockey field)
 Barbecue open space

Access
 By train: About 10 minutes’ walk from Higashi-fuchū Station on the Keiō Line.

See also
 Parks and gardens in Tokyo
 National Parks of Japan

References

 Website of Tokyo Metropolitan Park Association (in Japanese)

External links
 Website of Fuchu City (in Japanese)
Parks and gardens in Tokyo